

Births and deaths

Deaths
 Felix Doran (c. 1915–1972)
 Willie Clancy (1918–1973)
 Joe Cooley (1924–1973)

Recordings
 1970 "Moondance" (Van Morrison)
 1971 "Prosperous" (Christy Moore)
 1972 Alone Again (Naturally) (Gilbert O'Sullivan) (US No. 1)
 1972 Clair (Gilbert O'Sullivan) (UK No. 1)
 1972 "Get Down" (Gilbert O'Sullivan) (UK No. 1)
 1972 "Happy to Meet, Sorry To Part" (Horslips)
 1972 "Planxty" (Planxty)
 1973 "The Tain" (Horslips)
 1973 "Well Below The Valley" (Planxty)
 1974 "Dancehall Sweethearts" (Horslips)
 1975 "Carolan's Receipt" (Derek Bell)
 1975 "Drive the Cold Winter Away" (Horslips)
 1975 "De Dannan" (De Dannan)
 1976 "The Book of Invasions" (Horslips)
 1977 "7" (Chieftains)
 1978 "8" (Chieftains)
 1979 "Broken Hearted I'll Wander" (Dolores Keane & John Faulkner)

1970s